The 13th Aerobic Gymnastics World Championships were held in Cancun, Mexico from June 27 to June 29, 2014.

Medal summary

Results

Women's Individual

Men's Individual

Mixed Pairs

Trios

Groups

Dance

Step

Team

Medal table

References

 FIG official site
 Official results

World Aerobic Gymnastics Championships
World Aerobic Gymnastics Championships
World Aerobic Gymnastics Championships
Aerobic Gymnastics World Championships
Sport in Cancún
International gymnastics competitions hosted by Mexico